UNOC may refer to any of the following:

 United Nations Operation in the Congo, a United Nations peacekeeping force in Congo in the 1960s
United Nations Ocean Conference, a United Nations conference dedicated to conservation of the oceans 
 Uganda National Oil Company, Uganda's state-owned oil company.

See also 

 UOCN, Union of Chinese Nationalists, an unofficial Chinese political party
UNCO, University of Northern Colorado, in Greeley, Colorado, USA